"Say What's in Your Heart" is a song written by Donny Lowery and Don Schlitz, and recorded by American country music group Restless Heart. It was released in July 1989 as the fourth and final single from their album Big Dreams in a Small Town. The song reached number 4 on the Billboard Hot Country Singles chart in October 1989 and number 1 on the RPM Country Tracks chart in Canada.

Music video
The music video was directed by Bill Balsley and premiered in mid-1989.

Chart performance

Year-end charts

References

1989 singles
Restless Heart songs
Songs written by Don Schlitz
Song recordings produced by Scott Hendricks
RCA Records singles
1989 songs
Songs written by Donny Lowery